CL-400 or variation, may refer to:

Vehicles
 Lockheed CL-400 Suntan, a proposed U.S. high altitude superfast spyplane of the late 1950s
 Canadair CL-44 (aka Rolls-Royce 400 PropJet, Canadair 400, CL-400), turboprop airliner
 Honda CL400, a 387cc single-cylinder motorcycle
 Mercedes-Benz CL 400, a luxury sedan, see Mercedes-Benz CL-Class

Other uses
 IBM CL 400, the CL scripting language variant for OS/400, see Control Language

See also
 Canadair CL-415, amphibious waterbomber